Varlam Kilasonia (born 13 August 1967) is a Georgian professional football manager and former player who is the head coach of Erovnuli Liga 2 club Merani Martvili.

Career

As a player, Varlam Kilasonia spent 17 years in four different countries.

He started his managerial career at Olimpi Rustavi in 2006.

Twice in a row, in 2016 and 2017, he led the newly created football club Rustavi to championship titles in the second tier, which in the second case implied automatic promotion to Erovnuli Liga.

Following three spells with this club, from July 2020 to June 2021 Kilasonia was in charge of Sioni Bolnisi, where he was named the best manager in round one of the season.

In late July 2022 he was announced as head coach of Merani Martvili.

Personal life

His brother Giorgi Kilasonia played for the Georgia national football team.

Honours
 Russian First League top scorer: 1996 (22 goals).

References

External links

Profile on Soccerway

1967 births
Living people
Soviet footballers
Footballers from Georgia (country)
Expatriate footballers from Georgia (country)
Expatriate footballers in Russia
Expatriate footballers in Ukraine
Expatriate sportspeople from Georgia (country) in Ukraine
Expatriate footballers in Azerbaijan
FC Dnipro players
FC Kuban Krasnodar players
Football managers from Georgia (country)
Expatriate sportspeople from Georgia (country) in Azerbaijan
Turan-Tovuz IK players
FC Metalurgi Rustavi players
FC Alazani Gurjaani players
Ukrainian Premier League players
Association football forwards
Association football midfielders
FC Lokomotiv Saint Petersburg players